Katherine Anne Scholes (born 5 July 1959) is an Australian writer. She was born in the Dodoma Region of Tanzania where her parents were English missionaries, and spent most of her childhood there before moving to England and then Tasmania.

Scholes is the author of the international bestsellers Make Me An Idol, The Rain Queen and The Stone Angel. She has also written several children's books including the acclaimed Peacetimes, The Boy and the Whale and a young adult novel The Blue Chameleon, which won a New South Wales State Literary Award. All of her books have been translated into numerous languages. Katherine also works in the film industry. She currently lives in Tasmania with her filmmaker husband Roger Scholes (1950-2022) and their two sons.

References

External links

 Author's Website

1959 births
Living people
Writers from Tasmania
People from Dodoma
Australian people of English descent
Australian women novelists
Australian women children's writers
Australian children's writers